Toro is a Local Government Area of Bauchi State, Nigeria. Toro local government headquarters is in the town of Toro. The local government has three districts: Toro, Jama'a and Lame district. The local government is the largest local government in Nigeria and west Africa in particular. It has an area of 6,932km and a population of 350,404 at the 2006 census. The postal code of the area is 740.

People and languages

Toro local government is rich in culture and has diverse ethnic groups such as Duguza, Fulani, Kaiwari, Hausa amongst others. However, Fulfulde is a major language spoken by the people of the area (especially in the town of Toro).

Some notable people from Toro

Alhaji Abubakar Umar is a member of Toro local government, He was the First Secretary to the Bauchi State Government, He served as a minister in various capacity during Nigeria's military administrations. He was a Principal Private Secretary to the Premier Of Northern Nigeria, Sir Ahmadu Bello. He was a Gubernatorial candidate in the 2nd Republic. The Bauchi State Secretariat was named after him in recognition of his efforts towards the creation of Bauchi State. He was an accomplished public servant. He is a fellow of Royal College of DEFENCE Studies in UK. The Late Walin Bauchi came from an educationally versed family. He died on 29 January 1998.
Senator Dr. Yakubu Ibrahim Lame is a member of the local government, former Senator, former minister of police affairs and former Chairman Space Management Agency
Dr. Habiba Muda Lawal Former Lecturer, Commissioner in Bauchi State and presently Permanent Secretary Ecological Fund office. She serve as the Acting Secretary to Government of the Federation for six months before the appointment of Boss Alhmustapha.  
Sani Ahmed Toro is a retired commissioner of sport in Bauchi state. He was a Chairman and member of NFF for some decades, and also a former Member, House of Representatives. 
Dr. Aliyu Tilde is an Academician, critic, writer and a politician. He was a former commissioner of Education in Bauchi state and one of the pioneers of Bauchi State University Gadau.
Ibrahim Abdulhamid Tilde a retired ex- Nigerian Air Force Fighter Jet & Transport pilot, Who flew the likes of Late General Sani Abacha and Former Nigerian President Chief Olusegun Obasanjo among others.
Justice Danladi Umar a Nigerian jurist[1] from Bauchi State and the incumbent Chairman of the Code Of Conduct Tribunal (CCT) of Nigeria is from the Toro local government.
Barr Ibrahim Zailani a Lawyer and Critic, He was a member Federal House of Representatives, former Chairman NIMASA, and former Senatorial and Gubernatorial aspirant.
'  Hon Haruna Ibrahim Tilde' an accountant, former PHCN Staff and member Federal House of Representatives (2007-2011), former senatorial candidate.
Senator Lawan Yahaya Gumau former member, Bauchi State House of Assembly and Federal House of Representatives and Senator representing Bauchi South at 9th Assembly.
• Honorable Umar Muda Lawal member representing Toro Federal Constituency Bauchi State at the 9th Assembly. 
•"Honorable Tukur Ibrahim" He is a member Bauchi state House of Assembly from 2011-2015 2015-2019 2019-date. He hold the position of Chief Whip in the House.

Some prominent schools

Teachers College Toro is popularly known as TC Toro was a school established in the year 1926. One of the oldest schools in Bauchi state. Ibrahim Zailani (Former Member House of Reps, Fmr. Executive NIMASA, Lawyer) and Mahmood Yakubu (The current Independent electoral commission) chairman was an alumnus of the school.

Government College, Toro. formerly known as science Toro. HRH Rilwan Sulaiman Adamu an old Boy of the college

Kingdom

The kingdom is traditional and hereditary-based. Late. Alh. Adamu Waziri (Katukan Bauchi)it is now under the rule by Umar Adamu Waziri. The head, Muhammad Inuwa II (Hardo) and Late. Alh. Ibrahim Baba Ahmad (Madakin Toro).

References

Local Government Areas in Bauchi State